William Augustus Devin (1871–1959) was an American jurist who served as an associate justice and chief justice of the North Carolina Supreme Court.

A native of Granville County, North Carolina, Devin, a Democrat, earned his undergraduate degree at Wake Forest College and his law degree at the University of North Carolina at Chapel Hill. Devin served as mayor of Oxford, North Carolina from 1903 until 1909 and was a captain in the North Carolina National Guard.

He was elected to one term (1911–1913) in the North Carolina House of Representatives from Granville. He also served as a state Superior Court judge (1914–1935) before being appointed by the Governor to the state Supreme Court in 1935. He retired as chief justice in early 1954.

On May 7, 1987, he was commemorated with a portrait.

References

North Carolina Manual, 1913

1871 births
1959 deaths
Members of the North Carolina House of Representatives
Wake Forest University alumni
University of North Carolina School of Law alumni
Chief Justices of the North Carolina Supreme Court
People from Granville County, North Carolina
North Carolina Tar Heels football players
19th-century players of American football